The men's Madison in cycling at the 2004 Summer Olympics was contested by 18 teams, 36 cyclists. The Madison race consisted of 200 laps of the track, or 50 kilometres.  It was a two-person team event, with a tag-team format used to allow one cyclist to rest while his teammate raced.

Medalists

Results
The Australian team of Stuart O'Grady and Graeme Brown rode consistently to achieve points in seven of the 10 sprints for a total of 22 points and the gold medal. The Swiss team of Franco Marvulli and Bruno Risi finished strongly winning the last three sprints for 15 points and the silver medal. British team of Rob Hayles and Bradley Wiggins achieved 12 points for the bronze medal, despite being in a fall mid-race.

References

External links
Official Olympic Report

M
Cycling at the Summer Olympics – Men's madison
Track cycling at the 2004 Summer Olympics
Men's events at the 2004 Summer Olympics